K208 or K-208 may refer to:

K-208 (Kansas highway), a former state highway in Kansas
Symphony, K. 208+102 (Mozart)

See also
Il re pastore